, abbreviated NAA, is a parastatal company responsible for the management of Narita International Airport in Japan. NAA was privatized on April 1, 2004.

Operations

NAA has operations in four core segments:

Airport operations: Maintains and manages the Narita Airport facilities.
Retailing: Operates shops on the airport premises, including duty-free shopping.
Facility leasing: Leases counter space, retail and office space, cargo warehouses, car park space and other property.
Railways: Holds majority stakes in Shibayama Railway (68.39%) and Narita Rapid Rail Access (63.74%).

Service 
On April 16, 2018, NAA launched a new English-language tourist information website to provide  overseas visitors to Japan with information on tourist attractions around Japan and their access from Narita Airport.

References

External links 
 Official Site

Narita International Airport
Government-owned companies of Japan
Companies based in Chiba Prefecture
Japanese companies established in 2004
Transport companies established in 2004
Airport operators of Japan